Douma District is a district of the Rif Dimashq Governorate in southern Syria.

The second largest district of Syria following Tadmur, it stretches from the northeastern outskirts of Metropolitan Damascus to the Jordanian border, covering large swaths of the sparsely inhabited Syrian Desert.

At the 2004 census, the district had a population of 433,719.

Subdistricts
The district of Douma is divided into seven sub-districts or nawāḥī (population ):

References

 
Districts of Rif Dimashq Governorate